Cumberland station may refer to:

Cumberland station (CTA), an "L" train station in Chicago
Cumberland station (Maryland), an Amtrak station in Cumberland, Maryland
Cumberland station (Metra), a station in Des Plaines, Illinois
Cumberland Avenue station (Tampa), a TECO Line Streetcar station in Tampa, Florida
Cumberland Street railway station, in Glasgow, Scotland

See also
Cumberland (disambiguation)